Cuba men's national softball team represents Cuba in international softball competitions.  
The team played at the 1988 World Championships were held in Saskatoon, Canada. They played 13 games in a round robin tournament, and beat Australia 7–4 in one game.

See also
Cuba women's national softball team

References

National sports teams of Cuba